Cross Hands is a town in Carmarthenshire, Wales, approximately  from Carmarthen.

Cross Hands Public Hall is one of only three of its kind in Wales. The Public Hall was erected in 1920 and designed by an unknown Italian designer in the classic Art Deco Style. Fully restored, the Public Hall has a fully functioning stage and cinema screen and is protected as a Grade 2 listed building.

The continuous built up area which includes the villages of Cross Hands, Gorslas, Cefneithin and Pen-y-groes had a population of 5,717 in 2011.

Cross hands is a growing residential and employment area and includes the established Cross Hands Food Park to the south west of the A48.  A new business park, the Cross Hands Business Park, is being developed to the northeast of the A48 which the local authority hopes will create 1,000 jobs.

New link road
On 2 December 2012, Carmarthenshire County Council announced plans for a new road to enable traffic on the A476 to bypass the congested Cross Hands roundabout. At an estimated cost of £20 million, the route will start from Gorslas, northeast of the roundabout, and continue to the Cross Hands Food Park junction on the A48. It will reconnect with the existing A476 southwest of the Cross Hands roundabout.

Notable people 
 Eifion Evans (1931–2017), a Welsh pastor and church historian.
 Ken Jones (1941–2022), a Welsh international rugby union player.

References

External links
Cross Hands Food Park

Villages in Carmarthenshire
Swansea Bay (region)